Nurse is the first major label album released by the rock band Therapy? It was released in 1992 on A&M Records.

Background 
The album was written in a farm house in County Carlow, Ireland. It was mainly recorded at Loco Studio in Caerleon, Wales, apart from "Gone" which was recorded in Annamoe, Ireland. It marked a departure from the noise punk style of the two mini-albums, being a more industrial-sounding record. The album was rated favourably by critics and reached number 38 in the UK Albums Chart.

Releases 
The album was released on 12" vinyl, CD and cassette. In the US, the album was released on limited edition red 12" vinyl, CD and cassette. 

A remastered CD version of the album by the original producer, Harvey Birrell, was included in The Gemil Box, released on 18 November 2013. 

The original master of the album was used for a 'Music on Vinyl' audiophile re-issue, released on mixed red and gold 180g vinyl on 22 February 2016, limited to 1000 numbered copies It was also released on standard black vinyl release.

The first vinyl reissue featuring the 2013 remaster was released by Caroline Records on 12 June 2021 for Record Store Day in the UK and Ireland, on red vinyl and limited to 800 copies.

Furthermore, the album was reissued on 26 November 2021 by Caroline Records featuring the 2013 remaster on black vinyl and 2CD format. The CD version contains an extra disc of b-sides and previously unreleased demos.

Critical reception 
The Encyclopedia of Popular Music wrote that the album "featured more complex arrangements and themes than the punk-descended speed burn-outs of earlier releases." Trouser Press called the album an "unforgettable bomb blast of a record [that] fine-tunes the atmosphere of the first two EPs by adding a little more crunch to the low end."

Track listing

Personnel 
Therapy? 
Andy Cairns – vocals, guitar
Fyfe Ewing – vocals, drums
Michael McKeegan – bass guitar
with:
David James – cello on "Gone"
Technical
Harvey Birrell – producer, live sound, samples
Nick Atkins – engineer
Andrew Catlin – photography
Jeremy Pearce – design
Simon Carrington – design

Singles 
"Teethgrinder" was released on 19 October 1992 on CD and 12" with "Summer of Hate", "Human Mechanism" and "Sky High McKay(e)". A remix 12" was also released featuring "Teethgrinder" (Tee Hee Dub Mix) and "Teethgrinder" (Unsane Mix). The single reached number 30 in the UK Singles Chart and number 19 in the Irish Singles Chart.
"Nausea" was released as a radio-only single in America in 1992 with "Teethgrinder" (Tee Hee Dub Mix).
"Perversonality" was released as a radio-only single in America in 1993 with "Totally Random Man" (BBC version), "Neck Freak" (new recording) and "Bloody Blue".

Promotional videos 
 "Teethgrinder": directed by Jon Klein
 "Nausea": directed by Jon Klein

Sampling 
The sample in "Nausea" ("Here I am motherfuckers!") is taken from the 1988 film Ghosts… of the Civil Dead and is spoken by Nick Cave.
The sample in "Teethgrinder" ("He's losing his mind and he feels it going") is taken from a 1960s information film by the US Navy warning of the dangers of LSD, a section of which was later included in a BBC documentary called The Beyond Within. The sample was also used by the Canadian group Skinny Puppy near the beginning of the track "Convulsion" from Too Dark Park (1990).
Other samples in "Teethgrinder" are taken from a TV documentary entitled American Conversations.

References 

1992 albums
Therapy? albums
A&M Records albums